See You Yesterday is a 2019 American science fiction film directed by Stefon Bristol with a screenplay by Bristol and Fredrica Bailey based on Bristol's 2017 short film of the same name. It stars Eden Duncan-Smith, Dante Crichlow and Astro. 

The film follows the story of an ambitious science prodigy, who uses her prowess and capabilities to create time machines to save her brother who has been killed by a racist police officer. As she tries to alter the events of the past, she will eventually face the perilous consequences of time travel.

It was released on May 17, 2019, by Netflix. The film received positive reviews and was nominated for two awards at the 35th Independent Spirit Awards, with Bristol and Bailey winning Best First Screenplay.

Plot
C.J. Walker is an ambitious black science prodigy who, alongside her best friend Sebastian 'Bash' Thomas, is working together on building a time machine. Their first attempt, in which their backpacks catch fire and ultimately don't work, is right before the last day of school. 

C.J. and Bash's last class before the summer is with their science teacher Mr. Lockhart (fittingly played by Back to the Future's Michael J. Fox). As the teens are aspiring to present their last class project at the Science Expo on the week of July 5th, she asks him to raise their project grade from a B+ to an A to greater impress potential scouts. He invites her to contemplate the ramifications of time travel, the ethical and philosophical conundrum that it could cause.  

The pair successfully achieve time travel, going back 24 hours. Although they are aware there could be repercutions with changing the future, C.J. seeks revenge on her ex-boyfriend Jared by pranking him. When he gives chase he is hit by a car, luckily only breaking his arm and not killing him. Bash chews her out, as they narrowly miss seeing themselves and almost don't get back to the future in time.

Back in the future, when July 4th arrives, Calvin and his friend Dennis leave a party after Jared confronts him over C.J. As they are walking away, two other black men bump into them rushing down the street. Shortly after a police car approaches, the officers are suspicious of them. Mistaking them for the real thieves they had been chasing, Calvin is shot dead.

Grieving after the funeral, when her mother says if she could turn back time she would, C.J. insists on going back a second time. Although Bash is very concerned with the risk they run to alter history again, he doesn't want her to go alone. They plan to reroute Calvin and Dennis before the shooting, but Jared spots and chases them for breaking his arm. The detour causes them to arrive too late to save Calvin.

They try a third time, and have to enlist their classmate Eduardo's help and borrow his highly resilient circuit boards. This time, C.J. decides that she and Bash thwart the convenience store robbery thus avoiding the police chase entirely. Bash fears something bad could happen as there are usually guns involved. C.J. warns the shop owner who pulls a gun, there is a shootout and Bash is caught in the crossfire. As she follows her dying friend out of the shop, Bash from a previous trip catches sight of her and comes over. He sees himself dying on the sidewalk then disappears as this timeline's Bash dies. 
 
Now, after Bash's funeral his grandmother has a nervous breakdown. Calvin approaches C.J. as he finds the memorial card from his own funeral and she's acting oddly. Forced to tell the truth, she tells him everything. She has to return alone as Bash's backpack has self-destructed. They get Eduardo to help reinforce her circuit board. 

This time on C.J.'s 4th time going back, with the 3rd timeline Bash confused as to why she has seemingly tanked the convenience store robbery thwarting, gets to her brother and Dennis earlier. However it takes time to convince him, so the trigger-happy cop drives up. Calvin lets slip that he has nothing to do with the robbery, so all four are thrown to the ground. When he realises the others could get killed, he sacrifices himself.                                           

Again back in the future, Bash confronts C.J. and demands to know how many times she's gone back. She finally admits this last time was the fourth as he'd died on the 3rd. He forbids her to try again, but she renegs.

The film ends with her back in time alone, breaking into a run.

Cast

Production
The film was shot in Queens and Brooklyn, New York in 2018.

Release
It was released on May 17, 2019 on Netflix streaming.

Reception
The film has received favorable reviews from critics. The website's critics consensus reads, "See You Yesterday marries a novel sci-fi premise with urgent social relevance and forges something excitedly new from the union—providing an impressive showcase for star Eden Duncan-Smith and debut writer-director Stefon Bristol." Metacritic, which uses a weighted average, assigned a score of 74 out of 100 based on nine critics, indicating "generally favorable reviews."

Brian Tallerico of the RogerEbert.com gave the film 3 out of 4 stars, reflecting on the film: "Bristol [the director] makes a number of smart decisions, including keeping it close to 80 minutes and bringing Flatbush to cinematic life", but as the film "becomes more cluttered with time travel loops, it becomes less interesting".

In a 2020 interview with The Atlantic, former football player turned children's author Martellus Bennett criticized the plot of the movie, lamenting that the movie could have been "the black version of Back to the Future" but took a violent turn instead (i.e. the cop shooting). According to him, "such narratives only reinforce the old dead-or-in-jail idea" as well as the notion that "Black trauma has become the de facto Black culture."

Music 
The soundtrack is mainly composed of reggae and soca music:

 Tenor Saw: "Ring the Alarm"
 Olatunji Yearwood: "Oh Yay!"
 Buddy feat. Ty Dolla Sign: "Hey Up There"
 New Babylon: "Reggae Revolution!
 Dawn Penn: "You Don't Love Me (No, No, No)"

See also
List of black films of the 2010s
List of Afrofuturist films
List of films featuring time loops

References

External links 
 
 
 

English-language Netflix original films
2019 films
2010s science fiction adventure films
40 Acres and a Mule Filmworks films
American science fiction adventure films
Fictional portrayals of the New York City Police Department
Films about the New York City Police Department
Films about miscarriage of justice
Films about racism
Films about time travel
Films scored by Michael Abels
Films shot in New York City
Films set in 2019
Films set in Brooklyn
Films set in the Bronx
Teen adventure films
2019 science fiction films
Time loop films
2019 directorial debut films
Features based on short films
2010s English-language films
2010s American films